Teong Tzen Wei is a Singaporean swimmer. He won the silver medal at the 2022 Commonwealth Games in the 50 m butterfly, becoming the third Singaporean athlete to win a swimming medal at the Commonwealth Games.

Career

2017: First Southeast Asian gold 
At the 2017 Southeast Asian Games, Teong clocked 22.55s in the final of the 50m freestyle, winning his first Southeast Asian Games gold.

2018: FINA Swimming World Cup silver 
Teong clinched 2 silvers in the mixed 4 x 50 medley and the mixed 4 x 50 freestyle relays at the last part of the FINA Swimming World Cup which was held in Singapore. In the mixed 4 x 50 freestyle, Singapore finished 2nd with a timing of 1.33.14, and in the mixed 4 x 50 medley, Singapore finished 2nd with a timing of 1.42.21.

2019: 2nd Southeast Asian Games gold 
Teong won his 2nd gold at the 2019 Southeast Asian Games, winning in the 50 m butterfly, defeating compatriot Joseph Schooling in the final with a timing of 23.55s, beating Schooling by six one hundredths of a second. Teong then lost in the 50 m freestyle event, clinching silver with a time of 22.40s. He was defeated by his compatriot Jonathan Tan, who clinched the games record of 22.25s.

2022: Two Southeast Asian Games golds and Commonwealth silver 
In May 2022, Teong took part in the 2021 Southeast Asian Games, which had been pushed back 1 year due to the pandemic. In the 50 m freestyle, Teong clinched the gold medal in a time of 21.93s, setting a new Games Record and Singaporean record, breaking Jonathan Tan's records of 22.25s and 22.12s respectively. In doing so, he became the first Southeast Asian man to go under 22 seconds in the 50 m freestyle. In the 50 m butterfly final, Teong clocked a timing of 23.04s, setting a new Games Record, winning his 4th gold at the Southeast Asian Games.

At the 2022 World Championships, Teong made it to the final of the 50 m butterfly. He was the only Asian in the final. He clocked a timing of 23.29s, finishing 8th overall.

One month later, in late July, Teong made it to the finals of the 50 m butterfly at the 2022 Commonwealth Games. He clinched a silver in the final, clocking a time of 23.21s, losing to 2014 champion Ben Proud who won in a time of 22.81s.

In December, at the Short-Course World Championships, Teong made it to the final of the 50 m butterfly. He set the Asian record in the   heats and repeated his time again in the finals, clocking 22.01s. He finished 4th in the final, missing out on a medal. Teong also swam the 50m freestyle, finishing 11th in the semi-final. He clocked 21.09s which is a national record & personal best.

Personal life 
In September 2022, Teong publicly admitted to consuming "controlled drugs" while he was overseas. He was given a one-month long suspension from Sports Singapore, and had his spexScholarship support withdrawn for one month, both starting from October 1st.

References 

Singaporean male swimmers

1997 births
Living people
Swimmers at the 2022 Commonwealth Games
Singaporean swimmers
Commonwealth Games competitors for Singapore
Commonwealth Games silver medallists for Singapore
Competitors at the 2017 Southeast Asian Games
Competitors at the 2019 Southeast Asian Games
Competitors at the 2021 Southeast Asian Games
Southeast Asian Games silver medalists for Singapore
Southeast Asian Games gold medalists for Singapore
20th-century Singaporean people
21st-century Singaporean people
Swimmers at the 2018 Asian Games
Commonwealth Games medallists in swimming
Medallists at the 2022 Commonwealth Games
Southeast Asian Games medalists in swimming